is a railway station operated by the East Japan Railway Company (JR East) in Hachinohe, Aomori, Japan.

Lines
It is one of six principal stations served by the Aoimori Railway Line and is the easternmost high-speed Shinkansen railway station in Japan.

Station layout
Hachinohe is an elevated station with one side platform and two island platforms serving five tracks for regular services, and two island platforms serving four tracks for Tōhoku Shinkansen services. The station has a Midori no Madoguchi staffed ticket office.

Platforms

History
Initially, the construction of a railroad close to the coast was opposed by the Imperial Japanese Army for defensive purposes, so the station was constructed at a considerable distance inland from the town center. The Hachinohe Line began operations on January 4, 1894, from Hachinohe Station. The Nippon Railway was nationalized on November 1, 1906, and Shiriuchi Station became a station on the Japanese Government Railways (JGR), which became the Japanese National Railways (JNR) after World War II. From 1929 to 1969, the now-defunct Nambu Railway also had its terminus at Shiriuchi Station. On April 1, 1971, Shiriuchi Station was renamed Hachinohe Station. The station previously named Hachinohe Station was renamed Hon-Hachinohe Station. Freight operations were transferred to the Hachinohe Freight Terminal later that year and were discontinued completely from 1986. With the privatization of JNR on April 1, 1987, the station came under the operational control of JR East.

A new station building was opened on July 1, 2002, and Tōhoku Shinkansen services began operation from December 12, 2002, with operations of the Tōhoku Main Line from Hachinohe to the border of Iwate Prefecture transferred to the new Aoimori Railway. Following the opening of the Tōhoku Shinkansen extension to Shin-Aomori on December 4, 2010, all Tōhoku Main Line local services through the station were transferred to the Aoimori Railway.

Passenger statistics
In fiscal 2015, the JR East portion of the station was used by an average of 4,491 passengers daily (boarding passengers only).

Connecting bus routes

Route buses 
JR Bus Tōhoku
For Lake Towada
Nanbu Bus
For Gonohe
For Konakano Bus Center via Yōka-machi
Towada Kanko Bus
For Towada via Shimoda and Rokunohe
For Mikka-machi
Hachonohe City Bus
For Asahigaoka Bus office via Mikka-machi

Highway buses 
 Sirius; For Ikebukuro Station and Tokyo Station
 Shimokita; For Ōmiya Station (Saitama) and Shinjuku Station
 Enburi; For Shinjuku Station and Tokyo Station
 For Karumai

Surrounding area
Hachinohe Station building "Umineko plaza"
Hotel Mets Hachinohe
Hachinohe area stockbroker Sangho Shinko center "Yutori"
Hachinohe-Ekimae post office
Hachinohe Red Cross hospital
Flat Hachinohe (indoor ice arena)

See also
 List of railway stations in Japan

References

External links

 Hachinohe Station map 
 JR East station information page 

Railway stations in Aomori Prefecture
Railway stations in Japan opened in 1891
Hachinohe Line
Hachinohe
Tōhoku Shinkansen
Aoimori Railway Line